Kobylniki may refer to the following places in Poland:
Kobylniki, Góra County in Lower Silesian Voivodeship (south-west Poland)
Kobylniki, Środa Śląska County in Lower Silesian Voivodeship (south-west Poland)
Kobylniki, Poddębice County in Łódź Voivodeship (central Poland)
Kobylniki, Sieradz County in Łódź Voivodeship (central Poland)
Kobylniki, Busko County in Świętokrzyskie Voivodeship (south-central Poland)
Kobylniki, Kazimierza County in Świętokrzyskie Voivodeship (south-central Poland)
Kobylniki, Masovian Voivodeship (east-central Poland)
Kobylniki, Grodzisk Wielkopolski County in Greater Poland Voivodeship (west-central Poland)
Kobylniki, Kościan County in Greater Poland Voivodeship (west-central Poland)
Kobylniki, Poznań County in Greater Poland Voivodeship (west-central Poland)
Kobylniki, Szamotuły County in Greater Poland Voivodeship (west-central Poland)

Kobylniki may refer to the following places in Belarus:
Kobylniki, Minsk Region (central Belarus)
Kobylniki, Vitebsk Region (north Belarus)